Seven Sisters is a set of seven surfing point breaks in the Mexican state of Baja California.  These breaks break best in the wintertime on West and Northwest swells.  All of the point breaks are subject to hazards such as rocks, rip currents and sometime even sharks have been spotted  at these breaks.     

Geography of Mexico
Ensenada, Baja California
Geography of Baja California